Chris Walker (born December 22, 1994) is an American professional basketball player, who most recently played for the Cleveland Charge of the NBA G League. He played college basketball for the Florida Gators.

High school career
Walker attended Holmes County High School, which he led as a senior to a 1A state championship and a 20-8 record, tallying 30 points, 15 rebounds and seven blocks in the title game. He also started in the 2013 Jordan Brand Classic, having 14 points and seven rebounds and earned McDonald's All-American honors.

Walker won the 2013 Powerade Jam fest. Beating Andrew Wiggins, Jabari Parker, and Aaron Gordon en route to the slam dunk contest victory.

College career
Having offers from Florida State, Baylor, Connecticut, Kansas, and Ohio State, Walker chose to play for the University of Florida, but due to his inability to academically qualify, he didn't enroll until December 2013. When he finally joined the Gators, he missed 10 more games while the NCAA investigated allegations that he had received improper benefits in high school, and an additional two when it was determined he had. In two seasons with the Gators, he averaged 3.7 points and 2.7 rebounds in 49 career appearances, including six starts.

Professional career

Rio Grande Valley Vipers (2015–2018)
After going undrafted in the 2015 NBA draft, Walker joined the Houston Rockets for the Las Vegas Summer League. On September 21, 2015, he signed with the Rockets, only to be waived by the team on October 23 after appearing in three preseason games.

On November 2, Walker was acquired by the Rio Grande Valley Vipers of the NBA Development League as an affiliate player of the Rockets.

Huellas del Siglo / Leones de Ponce (2018)
In April 2018, Walker signed with Huellas del Siglo of the Dominican Torneo de Baloncesto Superior, making his debut on April 17 in an 81–78 win over San Carlos.

On April 28, Walker signed with Leones de Ponce of the Puerto Rican Baloncesto Superior Nacional.

Second Stint with Rio Grande Valley Vipers (2018–2019)
Walker rejoined the Rio Grande Valley Vipers for the 2018–19 season.

Rilski Sportist Samokov (2020–2021)
On January 17, 2020, it was reported that Rilski Sportist Samokov had signed Walker.

Long Island Nets (2021–2022)
On October 23, 2021, the Long Island Nets selected Walker in 2021 NBA G League draft, Walker was included in the training camp roster of the Long Island Nets announced two days later. Walker was then later waived by the Nets on January 23, 2022.

Iowa Wolves (2022)
On January 24, 2022, Walker was acquired via available player pool by the Iowa Wolves. On February 11, 2022, Walker was waived by the Iowa Wolves.

Texas Legends (2022)
On February 26, 2022, Walker was acquired via available player pool by the Texas Legends. On March 16, 2022, Walker was waived.

Ontario Clippers (2022)
On March 18, 2022, Walker was acquired via available player pool by the Ontario Clippers.

Cleveland Charge (2022–2023)
On October 24, 2022, Walker joined the Cleveland Charge training camp roster. He was waived on November 1, but re-signed with the Charge on November 5. He was waived again on February 7.

Personal life
Walker grew up in Bonifay, Florida  He was raised by his Great Grandmother and Uncle, along with his two brothers. She died in 2009 when he was 14, and a family friend, Jeneen Campbell, became his guardian.

References

External links

 Florida Gators bio
 Sports-Reference.com profile
 RealGM profile

1994 births
Living people
Agua Caliente Clippers players
American men's basketball players
Basketball players from Florida
Cleveland Charge players
Florida Gators men's basketball players
Forwards (basketball)
Leones de Ponce basketball players
Long Island Nets players
McDonald's High School All-Americans
Parade High School All-Americans (boys' basketball)
People from Bonifay, Florida
Rio Grande Valley Vipers players
Texas Legends players